Yoʼnal Ahk III, also known as Ruler 5, was an ajaw of Piedras Negras, an ancient Maya settlement in Guatemala. He ruled during the Late Classic Period, from 758 to 767 AD. Yoʼnal Ahk III ascended to the throne upon the death of Itzam Kʼan Ahk II, who may have been Yoʼnal Ahk's father. He was succeeded by his probable brother, Haʼ Kʼin Xook in around 767 AD. Yoʼnal Ahk III left behind two surviving stelae at Piedras Negras, namely Stelae 14 and 16, the former of which has been called one of the finest niche stelae, according to Simon Martin and Nikolai Grube.

Reign 

Yoʼnal Ahk III, also known as Ruler 5, was likely the son of Itzam Kʼan Ahk II, based on Yoʼnal Ahk III's veneration of Itzam Kʼan Ahk II's mortuary temple. Yoʼnal Ahk III, whose name translates to "Black House Great Turtle", ascended to the throne of Piedras Negras on March 10, 758 AD (9.16.6.17.1 7 Imix 19 Wo in the Long Count), following the death of Itzam Kʼan Ahk II. Not much is known about either Yoʼnal Ahk III or his successor Haʼ Kʼin Xook, which led Flora Clancy to refer to both their reigns as "shadowy". James L. Fitzsimmons argues that, politically, Yoʼnal Ahk III was weaker than previous leaders of Piedras Negras, given that the ajaw erected only a handful of monuments and did not enforce his power beyond the existing Piedras Negras hegemony.

Monuments at El Cayo record that Yoʼnal Ahk III was involved in burial ceremonies for a sajal in 763 AD, although he was not involved in picking the leader's successor. It is also known that during his reign, a kʼiniʼ ajaw ("prince") of Piedras Negras, Tʼul Chiik, was captured by Yaxun Bʼalam IV of Yaxchilan; it has been hypothesized that Yoʼnal Ahk III's focus on smaller satellite kingdoms such as La Mar and Yax Niil was a tactic to build up a "base of support" to combat the growing threat that Yaxchilan posed. Yoʼnal Ahk III was succeeded by Haʼ Kʼin Xook, who was possibly his brother.

Monuments 
Only two monuments that Yoʼnal Ahk III erected survive today: Stelae 14 and 16. The first of these, Stela 14which Simon Martin and Nikolai Grube called the "finest of all 'niche' monuments"is the king's accession memorial. Raised  AD 761, it depicts an effigy of the king in a small hollow (or "niche") scattering incense. The monument was placed on the lower part of Structure O-13, and according to O'Neil, the stela's "form, imagery, and location acknowledged and responded to Structure O-13's participation in the processional circuit" of the site. The front of the monument features not only the ajaw, but also his mother standing "as witness" to her son. Her positioning likely suggested that she has just arrived from the West Group Plaza via a sacred route. Stela 14 also includes the names of several sculptors and artists. These names are difficult to translate, since many are unique and not found in any other extant Mayan glyphic texts.

Stela 16 celebrates the accession of a local sajal (or lesser Maya leader) at the nearby satellite kingdom of La Mar. This stela caused Tatiana Proskouriakoff to misidentify the sixth ajaw of Piedras Negras as this sajal, instead of Haʼ Kʼin Xook. The uniqueness of a La Mar ruler being celebrated on a Piedras Negras stela seems to signify that La Mar had, at the time of Yoʼnal Ahk III and possibly earlier, attained a certain degree of importance "within the Piedras Negras hegemony". The front of the stela is heavily weathered, but Megan O'Neil argues it likely featured a carving of Yoʼnal Ahk III, based on comparisons with other stelae at Piedras Negras, like Stelae 6 and 11.

References

Bibliography 

 
 
 
 
 
 
 
 

Kings of Piedras Negras
8th century in the Maya civilization
8th-century monarchs in North America